The spouse of the Governor of Virginia is given an honorary position, styled as First Lady or First Gentleman of the State of Virginia. To date there have been no female governors of the State of Virginia, and all first spouses have been first ladies.

The current first lady of Virginia is Suzanne Youngkin, the wife of incumbent Governor Glenn Youngkin, who assumed office in 2022.

Role 
The position of the first lady is not an elected one, carries no official duties, and receives no salary. However, the first lady holds a highly visible position in state government. Since 1813, the role of the first lady includes serving the host of the Executive Mansion. She organizes and attends official ceremonies and functions of state either along with, or in place of, the governor. It is common for the governor's spouse to select specific, non-political, causes to promote.

List

See also 

 List of governors of Virginia

References 

 
First Spouses
Governor of Virginia
American political hostesses
Women's social titles
Lists of spouses